Lomanikoro is a village in the Rewa Province of Fiji.

References

Populated places in Fiji
Rewa Province